Dimitar Dimitrioski (born 16 February 1998) is a Macedonian handball player who plays for Recoletas Atlético Valladolid and the Macedonian national team.

He participated at the 2017 Men's Junior World Handball Championship.

References

1998 births
Living people
Macedonian male handball players
Sportspeople from Prilep